The Academia Mexicana de Arquitectura (AMA, Mexican Academy of Architecture) is a Mexican professional architectural organization, that participates in all national debates of architects.

Presidents 
 Joaquin Alvarez Ordóñez
 Jesús Aguirre Cárdenas (1981–1984)
 Francisco Cobarrubias Gaytán

Notable members 
 Antonio Attolini Lack
 Aurelio Nuño Morales
 Enrique Carral Icaza
 Juan José Díaz Infante Núñez
 Sara Topelson de Grinberg
 Wiktor Zin

References 

Academia
Architecture-related professional associations
Arts organizations based in Mexico